On January 21, 2023, a mass shooting occurred in Monterey Park, California, United States. The gunman killed eleven people and injured nine others. The shooting happened at about 10:22 p.m. PST (UTC-8) at Star Ballroom Dance Studio, after an all-day Lunar New Year Festival was held on a nearby street. Shortly afterwards, the gunman drove north to Lai Lai Ballroom in nearby Alhambra to continue his shooting spree but was confronted by staff and disarmed before fleeing by car. The perpetrator was identified as 72-year-old Huu Can Tran (September 30, 1950 – January 22, 2023). He died from a self-inflicted gunshot wound during a standoff with police in Torrance the next day. It is the deadliest mass shooting in the history of Los Angeles County.

Background

About 65% of the residents are of Asian descent; in the 1990 census it became the first city in the mainland United States with a majority of residents of Asian descent. Tens of thousands of people had gathered nearby on January 21, Lunar New Year's Eve, for the start of the two-day festival, one of the largest Lunar New Year's celebrations in Southern California. The festival was scheduled to end at 9:00 p.m. that day and continue the next day. The event for Sunday was canceled. 

The Star Ballroom Dance Studio is a Chinese-owned dance studio in the 100 block of West Garvey Avenue, near the intersection of Garfield Avenue. It was holding a Lunar New Year countdown dance party from 8:00 p.m. to 12:30 a.m., which was not part of the festival. The Star Ballroom's dance parties and the studio generally, are popular with older Asian Americans.

Events

Monterey Park shooting
Gunfire was reported at the Star Ballroom at 10:22 p.m. on January 21, 2023. The gunman fled the scene. Monterey Park police responded within three minutes of the first 9-1-1 call, finding "individuals pouring out of the location screaming" when they arrived.Reis Thebault & Marc Fisher, Inside the Monterey Park massacre: A night of dancing, then gunshots, Washington Post (January 23, 2023). Ten people were pronounced dead at the scene. Ten others were taken to local hospitals. The gunman used a Cobray M-11/9, a  semi-automatic pistol variant of the MAC-11 with an extended high-capacity magazine. The gun and the high-capacity magazine are illegal in California. According to the county sheriff Robert Luna, the weapon was purchased in Monterey Park in 1999 but not registered. He also described the gunman as a male Asian wearing a black leather jacket, a black-and-white beanie, and glasses.

Tran fired 42 rounds in the dance hall. An unnamed witness to the shooting told the media that the gunman began "shooting everybody" in the ballroom and shooting some victims again while walking around. The studio's owner and manager, Ming Wei Ma reportedly was the first to rush the shooter, but was killed. One dancer, Yu Lan Kao, was killed shielding others from gunfire. Others may have done so as well.

The police took about five hours to alert the general public that the shooter was at large, although information was sent to police scanners and other government agencies. Scott Wiese, the city's new police chief (he began work two days before the shooting) said he did not wish to awaken the residents, who are predominantly Asian American, just because the police was "looking for a male Asian in Monterey Park". He also said that the police did not want to risk sharing the wrong information because it had about 40 witnesses, many of whom did not speak English.

Alhambra incident
A gunman entered the Lai Lai Ballroom and Studio on South Garfield Avenue. Brandon Tsay, a 26-year-old computer programmer whose family owns the Lai Lai ballroom, confronted the gunman in the lobby, wrestled the gun away, and chased him out.Nathan Solis & Alexandra E. Petri, 'I was gonna die here': How a man disarmed the Monterey Park shooter, Los Angeles Times (January 23, 2023). His actions were lauded as heroic.

The gunman fled in a white cargo van. He was later identified as the Monterey Park gunman. The suspect was identified by the weapon seized at the Alhambra scene, which gave authorities his name and description.

Gunman's suicide
The stop was made near the intersections of Sepulveda and Hawthorne boulevards. The van's license plates appeared to be stolen. As officers approached the van, they heard a single gunshot coming from inside, retreated, and requested tactical units to respond. During the standoff SWAT officers, both visually from their armored vehicles and via a drone-mounted camera, observed the man in the driver's seat slumped over the steering wheel of the van. He died by a self-inflicted gunshot wound to the head from a Norinco 7.62×25 mm handgun.

He was identified as the gunman responsible for both the Monterey Park shooting and the Alhambra incident.

Victims
Ten people, five men and five women, died at the scene – Valentino Marcos Alvero, 68, Hongying Jian, 62, Yu Lun Kao, 72, Lilan Li, 63, Ming Wei Ma, 72, My My Nhan, 65, Muoi Dai Ung, 67, Chia Ling Yau, 76, Wen Tau Yu, 64, and Xiujuan Yu, 57. Among them were Star Ballroom's owner and manager Ming Wei Ma and three citizens from Taiwan. An eleventh victim, Diana Man Ling Tom, 70, died at the LAC+USC Medical Center the day after the attack. Nine more people were injured in the shooting; seven of them remained hospitalized as of January 22, some in critical condition.

Perpetrator

The gunman was identified as 72-year-old Huu Can Tran. He was reportedly from China or Vietnam, according to different sources. Tran became a naturalized U.S. citizen in 1990 or 1991 and settled in the city of San Gabriel. In 2013 he sold his San Gabriel home, which was a five-minute drive away from the Star Ballroom. He lived there at the time of the shooting.

In the late 1990s, Tran met his wife-to-be at the Star Ballroom Dance Studio, where he taught informal dance lessons and was a regular patron; they were married in 2001. Four years later, Tran filed for a divorce, which was approved in 2006. His ex-wife stated that he was never violent while around her but was "quick to anger". He frequented both Star Ballroom and Lai Lai several years ago, sometimes volunteering as a dance instructor, but ended up clashing with the people there. According to the sheriff, Tran had not been to Star Ballroom in at least five years and did not appear to be targeting specific victims. According to the police department in Hemet, where Tran lived, he visited the station there on January 7 and January 9 alleging that his family was poisoning him and trying to steal money from him. He was asked to return with evidence but never did.

Tran was previously arrested by San Gabriel Police for unlawful possession of a firearm from a possible robbery at a liquor store in 1990, but he did not have a substantial criminal history. Tran had a history of multiple 911 hangups and domestic disturbance incidents according to records from the San Gabriel Police Department dated as early as 1992.

After the shooting, authorities searched Tran's home pursuant to a search warrant. Law enforcement found a Savage Arms .308 caliber bolt-action rifle, hundreds of rounds of ammunition, and items suggesting that Tran was manufacturing suppressors.

At 72 years of age, Tran became the second-oldest mass killer in U.S. history behind 73-year-old Carey Hal Dyess who, on June 2, 2011, shot and killed five people including his wife before killing himself near Yuma, Arizona.

Reactions

During the manhunt for the gunman, President Joe Biden instructed the Federal Bureau of Investigation to provide full support to the local authorities. He later offered condolences and ordered flags at the White House to be flown at half-staff. Los Angeles Mayor Karen Bass called the shooting "absolutely devastating", and Governor Gavin Newsom said that he was "monitoring the situation closely". In the days after the shooting, Newsom visited Tsay to thank him for his heroism, and attended a meeting between the victims in hospital.

The second day of Monterey Park's Lunar New Year festival was canceled. Security preparations were stepped up ahead of Lunar New Year celebrations in New York City, Miami, and Los Angeles.

Moments of silence across the country were held at Lunar New Year festivities as well as sporting events involving teams from Los Angeles.

It became the deadliest mass shooting in the history of Los Angeles County, exceeding the death toll of a massacre in Covina in 2008. The Monterey Park shooting was the second of three mass shootings in California in about a week, preceded by a house shooting in Goshen and followed by another shooting in Half Moon Bay, the three shootings killing a combined total of 24 people. It was also the fifth mass killing in the United States since the beginning of 2023.

See also
List of mass shootings in the United States in 2023
List of shootings in California

References

2023 active shooter incidents in the United States
2023 crimes in California
2023 in Los Angeles County, California
2023 mass shootings in the United States
2023 murders in the United States
21st-century mass murder in the United States
Attacks in the United States in 2023
Attacks on buildings and structures in California
Deaths by firearm in California
January 2023 crimes in the United States
Mass murder in California
Mass shootings in California
Mass shootings in the United States
Massacres in the United States
Massacres in 2023
Monterey Park, California
Murder in Los Angeles County, California
Murder–suicides in California
Taiwanese people murdered abroad